Stawiguda  is a village in Olsztyn County, Warmian-Masurian Voivodeship, in northern Poland. It is the seat of the gmina (administrative district) called Gmina Stawiguda. It is located in Warmia.

The village has a population of 1,639.

The historic church of St. James is located in Stawiguda.

References

Stawiguda